The 1983 Skate America was held in Rochester, New York. Medals were awarded in the disciplines of men's singles, ladies' singles, pair skating, and ice dancing.

Results

Men

Ladies

Pairs

Ice dancing

External links
 Skate Canada results

1985 in figure skating
Skate America